Edward Spencer Cowles (September 22, 1879 - November 16, 1954) was an American physician.

He married Florence Wolcott Jacquith and was the father of Virginia Cowles.

The Persian translation of his book Conquest of fatigue and fear won the Iranian Royal Book of the Year Award in 1957.

Works
 Conquest of fatigue and fear
 Don't be afraid! How to get rid of fear and fatigue
 Psychopathology
 Religion and medicine in the church

References

20th-century American physicians
1879 births
1954 deaths